Bernatsky is a Slavic surname. Notable people with the surname include:

Sergei Bernatsky, Russian ice hockey player
Volodymyr Bernatsky, Ukrainian artist, painter, and graphic designer
Jadon Bernatsky, Canadian Marketer

See also 
Biernacki, Polish surname

Slavic-language surnames